Rosemary Elena Konradin Haughton (née Luling; born 13 April 1927, London) is a British-born Catholic lay theologian, who has also resided in the United States.

The daughter of Peter Luling and Sylvia Thompson Luling, she has two sisters, Dr. Virginia Luling (died 2013), and Elizabeth Dooley (née Luling; died 1962). She attended the Farnham Girls' Grammar School, Queen's College, London, and the Slade School of Art. She married Algernon Haughton in 1948; the couple had 10 children.

Publications
 On Trying to Be Human
 The Passionate God
 The Catholic Thing
 The Transformation of Man
 The Drama of Salvation
 The Tower That Fell
 Images for Change
 Tales from Eternity
 Elizabeth's Greetings
 Song in a Strange Land
 The Re-Creation of Eve
 The Theology of Experience

Other
Rosemary and Algernon Haughton founded the Lothlorien Community in Dumfries and Galloway, Scotland in the 1970s. Since 1989 this thriving community has been managed by ROKPA International. Haughton is also the founder of the Wellspring Community in the United States.

Sources
 
 International Who's Who (2012; 75th edition), p. 809. Routledge: London & New York; .

References

1927 births
Living people
British expatriates in the United States
British theologians
British philosophers
British Roman Catholics
Writers from London
Roman Catholic writers